Udayasankar is an Indian film director known for his works in Telugu and Tamil cinema. He made his directorial debut with Pathavi Pramanam starring Vijayakanth and Vineetha. In 2000, he directed Kalisundam Raa, which won a National Film Award for Best Feature Film in Telugu.

Career
Udayasankar made his directorial debut film was Poochudava starring Abbas and Simran. His next directorial was in Telugu titled Kalisundam Raa starring Venkatesh and Simran, the film was rated as the biggest hit in Telugu cinema in 70 years until the release of Narasimha Naidu in 2001.

The lead pair and director again collaborated with Prematho Raa but failed to repeat the success of their previous venture. Udayasankar again returned to Tamil directing Vijayakanth for second time in Thavasi, the film received mixed reviews and did well at box office. He directed Raraju with Tottempudi Gopichand and Baladur with Ravi Teja in Telugu both films failed at box office. After a long gap, he directed Bhimavaram Bullodu in Telugu.

Filmography

Pathavi Pramanam (1994) (Tamil)
Poochudava (1997) (Tamil)
Kalisundam Raa (2000) (Telugu)
Prematho Raa (2001) (Telugu)
Thavasi (2001) (Tamil)
Ondagona Baa (2003) (Kannada)
Raraju (2006) (Telugu)
Baladur (2008) (Telugu)
Bhimavaram Bullodu (2014) (Telugu)

Awards
Nandi Award for Best Story Writer - Kalisundam Raa (2000)

References

Film directors from Tamil Nadu
Tamil film directors
Telugu film directors
Kannada film directors
Living people
National Film Award (India) winners
Year of birth missing (living people)